Tshi, Tchwi, or Oji are a group of people living in Ghana. The chief of these are the Ashanti, Fanti, Akim  and Aquapem. Their common language is Tshi, from which they gain their family name.

Notes

References

Ethnic groups in Ghana